Nogales is a city and commune in the Quillota Province of central Chile's fifth region of Valparaíso.

Geography 

Demographics
According to the 2002 census of the National Statistics Institute, Nogales has 21,633 inhabitants (10,786 men and 10,847 women). Of these, 18,698 (86.4%) lived in urban areas and 2,935 (13.6%) in rural areas. The population grew by 15.9% (2,964 persons) between the 1992 and 2002 censuses.

Administration
As a commune, Nogales is a third-level administrative division of Chile, administered by a communal council (consejo comunal), which is headed by a directly elected alcalde. The current alcalde is Óscar Cortés Puebla (PDC). The communal council has the following members:
 Juan Rivera (PC)
 Oscar Mena (Independent)
 Jorge Gómez (RN)
 Josué Godoy (PS)
 Jaime Lineros (PRSD)
 Nelson Verdejo (PPD)

Within the electoral divisions of Chile, Nogales is represented in the Chamber of Deputies by Eduardo Cerda (PDC) and Andrea Molina (UDI) as part of the 10th electoral district, (together with La Ligua, Petorca, Cabildo, Papudo, Zapallar, Puchuncaví, Quintero, Calera, La Cruz, Quillota and Hijuelas). The commune is represented in the Senate by Ignacio Walker Prieto (PDC) and Lily Pérez San Martín (RN) as part of the 5th senatorial constituency (Valparaíso-Cordillera).

References

External links 
  Municipality of Nogales

Communes of Chile
Populated places in Quillota Province